Mark Steel's in Town is a stand-up comedy show on BBC Radio 4, co-written and performed by Mark Steel. The series, which was first broadcast on 18 March 2009, is recorded in various towns and cities in the United Kingdom and occasionally elsewhere. Each episode is tailored to the town in which it is recorded, and the show is performed in front of a local audience.

The programme received positive reviews from critics because of Steel's observations of the locals, and that the series took place in multiple locations, compared to the majority of stand-up shows on radio and television, which are normally recorded in a single location. In 2010, Mark Steel's in Town won a Silver Award for "Best Comedy" in the Sony Radio Academy Awards, and two years later won the Gold Award in the same category. Also in 2010, the show won the Writers' Guild of Great Britain Award for "Best Radio Comedy / Light Entertainment". The series was voted "Best Radio Entertainment Show" in the Comedy.co.uk Awards held by the British Comedy Guide in 2012 and 2015.

Format

Before each episode, Steel researches the history of the place in which he is going to perform. His research interests include local notable people, landmarks, customs and humorous anecdotes. The majority of the research sometimes took place close to the actual recording date. For example, Steel carried out almost no research for his episode in Walsall until ten days before the recording. In Merthyr Tydfil he spent three days in the town, where he carried out research and met locals. He then performs a tailor-made show about the town in front of a local audience. The style of the programme is similar to other shows starring Steel, such as The Mark Steel Lectures, in which Steel presented a humorous lecture about a famous person in history.

Production
Due to the small budget, there were certain places the show could not be recorded during the first series. For example, no episodes in the first series were recorded in Scotland. Steel said in an interview:

"One of the restrictions we've got is that the budget for radio we've got going is so unbelievably, comically tiny, that we couldn't go to Scotland because the fare is too much. It is like some student fanzine. "Mum, can I borrow some money because I want to go to Scotland."<p> "So, I'm hoping, if we do another series, because I'd love to go to the Shetlands. I'd be really excited at going to the Shetlands. Because it is just like a fascinating place to be at the moment. Or even one of these sort of weird places in Cornwall. But that was too far as well." The second series did feature two episodes recorded in Scotland: one in Dumfries, on the Scottish border, and one in Kirkwall, Orkney.

Other than Steel, Pete Sinclair was the only other writer, providing additional material. Julia McKenzie produced the first two series, while Sam Bryant produced series 3 & 4. Ed Morrish produced Series 5; Carl Cooper produced series 6 to 9. Also working on the show were studio manager Jerry Peal, and production co-ordinators Sarah Sharpe, Trudi Stephens, Hayley Sterling and Beverly Tagg.

Reception
The majority of the reaction towards Mark Steel's in Town has been positive. In May 2010, the programme was given the Silver Award for "Best Comedy" in the Sony Radio Academy Awards. In May 2012, it won the Gold Award in the same category. In November 2010 it won the Writers' Guild of Great Britain Award for "Best Radio Comedy / Light Entertainment". In January 2013, it won the "Best Radio Entertainment Show" award in the 2012 Comedy.co.uk Awards held by the British Comedy Guide. It won the same award in 2015.

Chris Campling in The Times wrote a review of a show recorded in Skipton: "A tough gig? More like shooting fish in a barrel, to judge from the reception he received from the honest burghers of Skipton, North Yorkshire. From the moment he remarked on the fact that the hall in which he was performing was used as a cattle market during the day and was hosed out before the show – and got a roar of approving laughter – Steel must have known that he could do no wrong."

Campling and other critics have commented that one of the main features of the show is the ability of the locals to laugh at themselves and their eccentricities. Campling wrote of the Skipton show: "The ability to laugh at itself is one of this country's finest attributes, but the Skipton mob were only too happy to celebrate their insularity." Elisabeth Mahoney of The Guardian, who reviewed the Dartford episode, said: "Going to a place and insulting it takes guts and careful strategies. Steel made use of the fact that he is from nearby Swanley, both to signal that he knows the area but also that – whatever he was about to say about Dartford – it was better than his hometown." Another journalist, reviewing the Penzance episode in the North Devon Journal commented: "Why do we like programmes that laugh at us? Because, I hope, we laugh at ourselves. We're not ignorant of our stereotypes. West Cornwall? Aaarrrrr!"

Miranda Sawyer in The Observer also praised the show saying it was, "A simple idea, kindly and wittily executed by another unfashionably humane Englishman. Thank Gaia they still exist."

Hilda Swinney, the Portland correspondent for the Dorset Echo, said that at the recording on the Isle of Portland: "The audience, mostly Portlanders, were appreciative and very responsive to his humour and his views on 'their special island'. They left him in no doubt that a return of Mark Steel's in Town would be very welcome."

Stuart Morris, a historian who helped to provide research for Steel for the Portland show, commented: "I was amazed that he should have absorbed so much of the island's history in the short period of time that he had. He joked about the Portland winds, saying that in comparison, islanders wouldn't even have bothered to take out their kites in the face of Hurricane Katrina. He made a few remarks about Portland/Weymouth rivalry and our Weymouth friends present laughed as much as the rest of us."

Ian Wolf from the British Comedy Guide commented that: "The fact that the series moved from town to town was very impressive – as it meant Steel had to write a unique half-hour routine for each venue (compare this to most stand-ups, who only have to come up with about an hour of strong material a year!)."

Episodes

Series 1

Series 2

Series 3

Edinburgh Fringe Special

Series 4

Series 5

Series 6

Series 7

Series 8

Series 9

Series 10

Series 11

Series 12

Merchandise
The first series of Mark Steel's in Town was released for download on 1 March 2010. The series has yet to be released on CD,. However, all 11 series can be streamed free on the BBC Sounds website.

A book accompanying the series, entitled Mark Steel's in Town and published by Fourth Estate, was released on 27 October 2011.

See also
The Mark Steel Solution
The Mark Steel Revolution

References
General

Specific

External links

Mark Steel's official website
"Mark Steel: The significance of a concrete hippo in Walsall", a newspaper article about the show, by Steel, for The Independent.

2009 radio programme debuts
BBC Radio comedy programmes
BBC Radio 4 programmes